The Lily and the Rose; sometimes Lily of the Rose is a 1915 American silent drama film directed by Paul Powell and starring Lillian Gish. Preserved at the Library of Congress.

Cast
 Lillian Gish as Mary Randolph
 Wilfred Lucas as Jack Van Norman
 Rosie Dolly as Rose (as Rozsika Dolly)
 Loyola O'Connor as Letty Carrington
 Cora Drew as Molly Carrington
 Elmer Clifton as Allison Edwards
 Mary Alden
 William Hinckley
 Alberta Lee (uncredited)
 Frank Mills (uncredited)

See also
 Lillian Gish filmography

References

External links

1915 films
Silent American drama films
American silent feature films
1915 drama films
American black-and-white films
Films directed by Paul Powell (director)
1910s American films